Major Ezekiel Worthen (March 18, 1710 - 1793) was a New Hampshire native who participated in the American Revolutionary War, French and Indian War, King George's War, and the Siege of Louisbourg (1745).

References
 Jeanies Genealogy
 "Kensington (N.H.) -- History", The Online Books Page, Ezekiel on record in the Daughters of the American Revolution, Washington, DC, NH Vital Records, Town of Kensington, NH, Stackpole's History of NH, Chamber of Commerce, Cape Breton Island, Canada, *The essay following by Nellie Chase, 1948 DAR descendant.

People of colonial New Hampshire
1710 births
1793 deaths